Dharmalingam Kannan (8 July 1936 – 19 May 2006) was an Indian footballer. He competed in the men's tournament at the 1960 Summer Olympics.

Kannan played for Hyderabad from 1956 to 1958 and Bengal from 1959. He represented India in the 1958 Asian Games. He was employed with the Vehicle Depot, Secunderabad but moved to East Bengal.

Honours
East Bengal
Calcutta Football League: 1961
Durand Cup: 1960
IFA Shield: 1961
DCM Trophy: 1960

India
Merdeka Tournament runner-up: 1959

Bengal
 Santosh Trophy: 1958–59

References

Bibliography

External links
 

1936 births
2006 deaths
Indian footballers
India international footballers
East Bengal Club players
Olympic footballers of India
Footballers at the 1960 Summer Olympics
People from Secunderabad
Footballers from Hyderabad, India
Association football forwards
Calcutta Football League players
Footballers at the 1958 Asian Games
Asian Games competitors for India